The following is a timeline of the history of the city of Pisa in the Tuscany region of Italy.

Prior to 15th century

 225 BCE - A Roman army from Sardinia lands in Pisa.
 180 BCE - Pisa becomes a Roman colony.
 89 BCE - Pisans granted Roman citizenship.
 300 CE - Roman Catholic diocese of Pisa established (approximate date).
 805 CE - San Paolo a Ripa d'Arno monastery founded.
 812 CE - Pisa becomes part of the March of Tuscany (territory) of the Holy Roman Empire.
 990 - San Michele in Borgo monastery founded.
 1003 - Lucca-Pisa conflict occurs.
 1004 - Pisa sacked by Saracens.
 1063 - Pisa Cathedral construction begins.
 1011 - Pisa unsuccessfully attacked by Saracens again.
 1092
 Pisa Cathedral construction completed.
 Roman Catholic Archdiocese of Pisa established.
 1095 - Pisans join religious First Crusade forces fighting abroad.
 1118 - Pisa Cathedral consecrated.
 1119 - San Pietro in Vinculis church reconsecrated.
 1132 - San Sisto church consecrated.
 1140 - Piazza dei Cavalieri, Pisa. the square become the center of Pisa.
 1147–1150 - The Pisans joined in the Second Crusade.
 1150 - Santo Sepolcro church built (approximate date).
 1152 - Pisa Baptistery construction begins.
 1161 -  built.
 1162 - Pisan territory expands.
 1167 - Flood.(it)
 1173 - Tower of Pisa construction begins.
 1187 - Papal election, December 1187 held at Pisa.
 1228 - Conflict with the united forces of Florence and Lucca near Barga
 1230 - Santa Maria della Spina church and tower of the San Nicola church built (approximate date).
 1252 - Santa Caterina church built.
 1257 - Hospital built.
 1264 - San Francesco church built.
 1278 - Camposanto Monumentale (cemetery) built.
 1284 - Naval Battle of Meloria fought between Pisan and Genoese forces near Livorno; Genoese win.
 1329 - Santa Maria del Carmine church built.
 1342 - Lucca annexed to Pisa.
 1343 - University of Pisa founded by edict of Pope Clement VI.
 1399 - Republic of Pisa becomes a client state of the Duchy of Milan.

15th–19th centuries
 1402 -  becomes signore.
 1406
 Pisa besieged by Florentine forces.
 Cittadella Nuova (fortress) construction begins.
 1482 - Printing press in operation.
 1494 - French in power.
 1509 - Florentines in power.
 1543
 Orto botanico di Pisa (garden) founded.
  built.
 1551 - Population: 8,574 within the walls.
 1555 - Palazzo Lanfranchi, Pisa rebuiling completed.
 1562 - Piazza dei Cavalieri remodelled.
 1564 
 Palazzo della Carovana built.
 Birth of Galileo Galilei, astronomer, physicist and engineer.
 1569 - Santo Stefano dei Cavalieri church consecrated.
 1589 - Galileo begins teaching at the university.
 1590 - Lanfreducci palace built.
 1596 - Museo storia naturale di Pisa (museum) founded.
 1605 -  built.
 1680 - Flood.(it)
 1735 - "Austrian grand dukes of the house of Lorraine" in power.
 1745 - Population: 12,406 within the walls.
 1777 - Flood.(it)
 1810 - Scuola Normale Superiore di Pisa (school) founded.
 1815 -  created.
 1841 - Population: 40,477.
 1844 - Pisa-Livorno railway begins operating.
 1846 - Pisa–Lucca railway begins operating.
 1851 - University closes.
 1859 - University reestablished.
 1860 - Pisa becomes part of the Kingdom of Italy.
 1861 - Pisa-Massa railway begins operating.
 1865 -  (theatre) opens.
 1867 -  (theatre) opens.
 1881 - Population: 42,779.
 1885 -  opens.
 1897 - Population: 65,516.

20th century

 1909 - Pisa Sport Club formed.
 1919 - Arena Garibaldi opens.
 1930 - Società Storica Pisana (history society) formed.(it)
 1943 -  in World War II.
 1944 - Bombing.
 1945 -  in operation.
 1950 -  (bridge) built.
 1952 - United States military Camp Darby established near city.
 1963 - Biblioteca Comunale di Pisa (library) established.
 1979 - Associazione Teatro di Pisa (theatre organization) formed.
 1985 - May:  held.
 1987 - Sant'Anna School of Advanced Studies established.

21st century

 2008 - Marco Filippeschi becomes mayor.
 2013 - Population: 86,263.
 2015 - 31 May: Tuscan regional election, 2015 held.
 2018 - Michele Conti becomes mayor.

See also
 
 List of mayors of Pisa
 List of bishops of Pisa
 List of rulers of the Republic of Pisa, 11th-15th c. (in Italian)
  (state archives)
 History of Tuscany

Other cities in the macroregion of Central Italy:(it)
 Timeline of Ancona, Marche region
 Timeline of Arezzo, Tuscany region
 Timeline of Florence, Tuscany
 Timeline of Livorno, Tuscany
 Timeline of Lucca, Tuscany
 Timeline of Perugia, Umbria region
 Timeline of Pistoia, Tuscany
 Timeline of Prato, Tuscany
 Timeline of Rome, Lazio region
 Timeline of Siena, Tuscany

References

This article incorporates information from the Italian Wikipedia.

Bibliography

in English
 
 
 
 
 
 
 
 
 
  David Herlihy. Pisa in the Early Renaissance: A Study of Urban Growth (New Haven, CT, 1958)
 
 
 
 O. Banti. An Illustrated History of Pisa (Pisa, 2010)

in Italian

 
 
 
  (timeline)
 
 
 
 A. R. Masetti. Pisa storia urbana (Pisa, 1964)
 L. Nuti. Pisa progetto e città, 1814–1865 (Pisa, 1986)
 
 E. Tolaini. Pisa (Rome, and Bari, 1992)
 P. L. Rupi and A. Martinelli. Pisa: Storia urbanistica (Ospedaletto, 1997)

External links
 Items related to Pisa, various dates (via Europeana)
 Items related to Pisa, various dates (via Digital Public Library of America)

 
Pisa